Schiava del peccato (Slave to Sin) is a 1954 Italian melodrama film directed by Raffaello Matarazzo.

Cast
 Silvana Pampanini as Mara Gualtieri
 Marcello Mastroianni as Giulio
 Irene Genna  as Dina
 Franco Fabrizi as Carlo
 Renato Vicario as Husband of Dina
 Camillo Pilotto as Inspector
 Liliana Gerace as Elena
 Olinto Cristina as Director
 Paul Muller as Voyager
 Dina Perbellini as Miss Cesira
 Maria Materzanini as Maria Grazia Sandri
 Maria Grazia Francia
 Irène Galter
 Laura Gore
 Turi Pandolfini
 Loris Gizzi
 Miranda Campa
 Giorgio Capecchi
 Adriana Danieli
 Mirella Di Lauri
 Franca Dominici
 Checco Durante
 Lia Lena
 Maria Grazia Monaci
 Aldo Pini
 Isarco Ravaioli
 Andreina Zani

References

External links

1954 films
1954 drama films
Italian drama films
1950s Italian-language films
Italian black-and-white films
Films directed by Raffaello Matarazzo
Films about prostitution in Italy
Films scored by Renzo Rossellini
Melodrama films
1950s Italian films